Merobaudes is the name of two figures in ancient Rome:
 Merobaudes (magister peditum), Frankish general and Roman consul
 Merobaudes (poet), rhetorician and poet